Martin Kunert (born Marcin Stanisław Kunert-Dziewanowski; 1974) is a feature film and television writer, director and producer; and since 2010, a photographer. In 2004, Kunert conceived and directed the documentary Voices of Iraq, made by sending 150 DV cameras to Iraqis to film their own lives. MovieMaker Magazine hailed the film as "truly a groundbreaking film…both in terms of its content and the process behind its production."

Previously, Kunert created and executive produced MTV's Fear, the first reality show to have contestants film themselves. Kunert created the show's frightening ambiance, developed the oft-mimicked visual and musical style and streamlined the show's editing process, where on a weekly basis, over 250 hours of contestant generated video was edited into 45-minute episodes. MTV's Fear spawned TV specials, fan clubs, DVDs, and numerous copycat television shows, including NBC's Fear Factor and VH1's Celebrity Paranormal Project.

Kunert has also directed television and feature films, including the cult favorite Campfire Tales (starring Amy Smart, Jimmy Marsden, Ron Livingston, and Christine Taylor) for New Line Cinema and Rogue Force (starring Michael Rooker and Robert Patrick) for Miramax. His screenplays include Warner Bros.' Dodging Bullets for Will Smith and Halle Berry, Paramount's The Brazilian, and 20th Century Fox's Hindenburg for Jan de Bont. He created and executive produced "HRT" (starring Michael Rooker and Ernie Hudson) for CBS and Columbia TriStar and "Catch" for CBS. With Doug Liman, Kunert reinvented "CHiPs" for NBC and Warner Bros. He also created the reality show "Mayor" for Columbia TriStar. In 2002, NBC/StudiosUSA signed Kunert to an exclusive writing/directing/producing contract.  He wrote and executive produced "Witch Doctor", a TV pilot for Beacon TV and ABC television studios in 2008.

In 2011, DirecTV, Technicolor, and Panasonic got together to finance an experimental 3D film for Kunert to direct and shoot on Panasonic's new 3D camera systems.  As part of it, Technicolor trained Kunert extensively on how to make clean, non-headache inducing, 3D motion images.  DirecTV will distribute the 3D film internationally.

Kunert is a graduate of New York University's film school. He is a member of the Directors Guild of America and Writers Guild of America.

He was born in Warsaw, Poland and grew up in Westfield, New Jersey before attending the New York Military Academy.

Filmography

References

External links 

MartinKunert.com

American male screenwriters
American film producers
Polish emigrants to the United States
Fashion photographers
Living people
New York Military Academy alumni
People from Westfield, New Jersey
Tisch School of the Arts alumni
American chief executives
1970 births
Film directors from New Jersey
Television producers from New Jersey